Dodia is a genus of woolly bear moths in the family Erebidae. The genus was erected by Harrison Gray Dyar Jr. in 1901. The moths are found in subarctic tundra and taiga ecosystems. They belong to the subtribe Callimorphina of tribe Arctiini.

Like most of their closest relatives, they are mid-sized moths (a few cm/around 1 inch wingspan) which may be active all day, but avoid direct sunlight. Unlike many of the Callimorphina, they are inconspicuous and coloured a somewhat translucent grey-brown and without bold markings. They have the typical slender body shape of other species of their subtribe, and they resemble, at a casual glance, certain larentiine geometer moths (Geometridae), e.g. the Operophterini, rather than the more typical Callimorphina. Like in the former, flightless females are known to occur in Dodia.

Species
Long held to contain only two species, several more have been discovered and described since the 1980s. Consequently, it is quite possible that further species await discovery. As of 2009, the known species are:
 Dodia albertae Dyar, 1901
 Dodia diaphana (Eversmann, 1848)
 Dodia kononenkoi Tshistjakov & Lafontaine, 1984
 Dodia maja Rekelj & Česanek, 2009
 Dodia sazonovi Dubatolov, 1990
 Dodia tarandus Schmidt et Macaulay, 2009
 Dodia transbaikalensis Tshistjakov, 1988 (sometimes in D. kononenkoi)
 Dodia verticalis Lafontaine & Troubridge, [2000] 1999

Footnotes

References

Rekelj, J. & Česanek, M. (2009). "Dodia maja sp. n., a new tiger moth from the Magadan territory, Russia (Lepidoptera: Arctiidae)". Acta Zoologica Academiae Scientiarum Hungaricae. 55 (3): 275–282.

Callimorphina
Moth genera